Kenneth Terry Jackson (born 1939) is a professor emeritus of history and social sciences at Columbia University. A frequent television guest, he is best known as an urban historian and a preeminent authority on the history of New York City, where he lives on the Upper West Side.

Biography

Jackson was born in Memphis, Tennessee in 1939. He earned his B.A. in 1961 from Memphis State University, where he was a member of the Pi Kappa Alpha fraternity, and his Ph.D. in 1966 at the University of Chicago. He served as an assistant professor for the Air Force Institute of Technology at Wright-Patterson Air Force Base from 1965 to 1968 and then joined the Columbia faculty as an assistant professor in 1968, earning his tenure by 1970.

Jackson's achievements as an author include The Ku Klux Klan in the City, 1915–1930 (1967), Cities in American History (1972), Crabgrass Frontier: The Suburbanization of the United States (1985), and The Encyclopedia of New York City (1995), for which he served as the primary editor. Crabgrass Frontier, a comprehensive study of the factors influencing suburban growth in the United States is the preeminent source on the history of American suburbanization. The Encyclopedia of New York City is a massive collection of entries and articles that encompass much of modern-day New York and the city's history. He earned a Bancroft Prize in 1986 for Crabgrass Frontier.

Jackson has earned numerous distinctions as a professor at Columbia University, where he was the director of the Herbert H. Lehman Center for American History and the Jacques Barzun Professor of History and Social Sciences. Jackson formerly taught a lecture class at the university on "The History of the City of New York." The course included numerous field trips, including walking tours, bus trips and an annual all-night bike ride led by Jackson from Morningside Heights in Manhattan to the Promenade in Brooklyn. The all-night bike ride is in its 37th consecutive year, as of 2011, and has received coverage from media outlets such as The Wall Street Journal.

Jackson has also served as president of the Urban History Association, the Society of American Historians, the Organization of American Historians, and the New-York Historical Society.

Jackson was a prominent on camera presence in the 1999 film, New York: A Documentary Film, directed by Ric Burns for PBS. Among his notable students are Janice Min, Rohit Aggarwala, Jonathan Lemire, and Suzy Shuster.

Selected works
 
 Cities in American History (1972)
 Crabgrass Frontier: The Suburbanization of the United States (1985)
 Silent Cities: The Evolution of the American Cemetery (1990), with Camilo Vergara
 The Encyclopedia of New York City (1995), (ed.)
 Empire City (2002), (ed.), with David Dunbar (ed.)
 Robert Moses and the Modern City: The Transformation of New York (2007), (ed.), with Hilary Ballon (ed.)

References

External links
Kenneth T. Jackson bio
Kenneth T. Jackson - New York State Writers Institute
PBS: Interview with Kenneth T. Jackson

1939 births
People from Memphis, Tennessee
Living people
Columbia University faculty
Historians of New York City
Urban historians
Bancroft Prize winners
University of Memphis alumni
University of Chicago alumni